The Rice Tobacco Factory is a historic tobacco factory located at 112 N. Cherry St. in Greenville, Kentucky. The factory was built in 1922 by S.E. Rice, whose S.E. Rice Company was founded in 1904. Tobacco had been Muhlenberg County's largest cash crop throughout the 19th century, and the region became known for its variety, called "Greenville Tobacco". The Rice factory, however, was the last building built in Greenville for tobacco production. It is now the only surviving commercial building connected to the city's tobacco industry.  The property was acquired in March, 2018, and the new owner is in the process of a historic rehabilitation of the building.

The factory was added to the National Register of Historic Places on August 15, 1985.

References

External links

Industrial buildings and structures on the National Register of Historic Places in Kentucky
Industrial buildings completed in 1922
Tobacco buildings in the United States
National Register of Historic Places in Muhlenberg County, Kentucky
1922 establishments in Kentucky
Greenville, Kentucky